Refil may refer to:
 Refil Björnsson, a son of the Swedish king Björn Ironside and brother of king Erik Björnsson in Hervarar saga and in Nafnaþulur
 Refil (sword), the sword of Regin in Skáldskaparmál